The 1914 Rice Owls football team was an American football team that represented Rice University as an independent during the 1914 college football season. In its third season under head coach Philip Arbuckle, the team compiled a 3–2–3 record and was outscored by a total of 113 to 59.

Schedule

References

Rice
Rice Owls football seasons
Rice Owls football